Joe Rose may refer to:

Joe Rose (American football) (born 1957), American football player
Joe Rose (actor), actor best known for his part in Scrubs
Joe Rose (activist) (died 1989), Canadian gay rights activist, killed by gay bashers in 1989
Joe Rose, fictional character in Ian McEwan's novel Enduring Love and its subsequent film adaptation

See also
Joseph Nelson Rose (1862–1928), American botanist